Napeogenes tolosa, the Tolosa tigerwing, is a species of butterfly of the family Nymphalidae. It is found from Mexico to northern South America.

The larvae feed on Solanum and Lycianthes species.

Subspecies
Napeogenes tolosa tolosa (Mexico)
Napeogenes tolosa amara Godman, 1899 (Nicaragua, Costa Rica, Panama)
Napeogenes tolosa chrispina (Hewitson, 1874) (Ecuador, Colombia)
Napeogenes tolosa diaphanosa Kaye, 1918 (Colombia)
Napeogenes tolosa mombachoensis Brabant & Maes, 1997 (Nicaragua)

There are two undescribed subspecies from Panama.

References

Butterflies described in 1855
Ithomiini
Nymphalidae of South America
Taxa named by William Chapman Hewitson